Patrizio Sala (born 16 June 1955) is an Italian former football manager and former football player who played as a midfielder.

Club career

Sala was born in Bellusco, Lombardy. During his club career he played for Serie A clubs, Torino (1975–81), Sampdoria (1981–82), Fiorentina (1982–84), Pisa (1983–84), Cesena (1984–88), and Parma (1987–89), starting and ending his career with lower division clubs Monza (1973–75), and Solbiatese (1989–90). He won the Serie A title with Torino in 1976.

International career
Sala also played for the Italy national football team, making 8 appearances for his country between 1976 and 1980. He was a member of the 1978 FIFA World Cup squad under manager Enzo Bearzot, playing in one game at the tournament, as Italy finished in 4th place.

Honours
Monza
Coppa Italia Semiprofessionisti (2): 1973–74, 1974–75

Torino
Serie A: 1975–76

References

External links
Profile at Enciclopediadelcalcio.it

1955 births
Living people
Sportspeople from the Metropolitan City of Milan
Italian footballers
Italy international footballers
1978 FIFA World Cup players
Torino F.C. players
U.C. Sampdoria players
ACF Fiorentina players
Pisa S.C. players
A.C. Cesena players
Parma Calcio 1913 players
Serie A players
People from Brianza
Association football midfielders
A.S.D. La Biellese managers
Serie A (women's football) managers
Footballers from Lombardy